Stegasta capitella, the teaweed moth, is a moth of the family Gelechiidae. It was described by Johan Christian Fabricius in 1794. It is found in West Indies and the south-eastern United States, where it has been recorded from Florida, Georgia and Texas.

The length of the forewings is about 4 mm. Adults are on wing from February to August and in October and December in Florida.

The larvae feed on peanut and Sida spinosa.

References

Moths described in 1794
Stegasta